The 2019 Fusagasugá City Council election was held on Sunday, 27 October 2019, to elect the fifth City Council since the 2002 reform (Legislative Act 2002). At stake were all 17 seats in the City Council. There are twenty polling stations authorized by the Registradury.

Results

Polling vote

References 

2019
Regional elections